Lieutenant General Björn Gustaf Eriksson Bjuggren, “Bjuggas”, (29 January 1904 – 4 April 1968) was a Swedish Air Force officer and aviator. Bjuggren senior commands include wing commander of the Jämtland Wing, head of the Royal Swedish Air Force Staff College and commanding officer of the First Air Group. After his active military career, he served as War Materials Inspector and head of the National Swedish War Materials Inspectorate.

Early life
Bjuggren was born on 29 January 1904 in Karlsborg, Sweden, the son of colonel  (1874–1963) and his wife Ketty (née Ellsén). He passed studentexamen in Stockholm in 1922.

Career
Bjuggren was commissioned as an officer in 1924. He attended the Artillery and Engineering College from 1926 to 1928 and various flight schools in 1928, 1930 and in 1933. Bjuggren participated in competitions in modern pentathlon in Germany in 1927 and in Finland in 1929. He studied aeronautics at the Royal Institute of Technology from 1931 to 1932 and studied in aircraft industries in Germany, France, Italy, England and in the Netherlands from 1932 to 1933. Bjuggren was an expert in the 1930 Defense Commission from 1933 to 1936 and studied at the Royal Swedish Army Staff College from 1934 to 1936. He also conducted trials and experimentation of dive bombing methods in 1934 and served during French bomb preparations in 1935. Bjuggren was promoted to captain in the Swedish Air Force in 1937 and was a teacher at the Royal Military Academy the same year. He was also an instructor in dive bombing in Finland and Denmark in 1937 and 1939. Bjuggren was also a teacher at the Royal Swedish Air Force Staff College in 1939.

During 1939-1940, he acted as chief of staff to the Flying Regiment 19, Finnish Air Force during the Winter War. In 1940-1941 he conducted test flights of dive bombers in Germany, France and the Netherlands and was headed the Swedish Air Force commission in Italy that carried out purchases of Caproni Ca.313 and Reggiane Re.2000. Bjuggren was promoted to major in 1941 and was head of the Operation Department at the Air Staff from 1941 to 1942. He was promoted to lieutenant colonel in 1943 and was commanding officer of Jämtland Wing (F 4) from 1943 to 1947. Bjuggren became a member of the Royal Swedish Academy of War Sciences in 1945 and was promoted to colonel the following year. He was then head of the Royal Swedish Air Force Staff College from 1947 to 1949 and was Inspector of Flight Security (Inspektör för flygsäkerhetstjänsten) from 1949 to 1952. Bjuggren was commanding officer of the First Air Group (E 1) from 1952 to 1964 and was then War Materials Inspector and head of the National Swedish War Materials Inspectorate from 1 January 1965 until his death on 4 April 1968.

Personal life
He was married 1928–1932 with Ingert Malmberg (1908–1967), the daughter of music writer Helge Malmberg and actress Anna Rosenbaum. In 1933 he married dance artist Jeanna Falk (1901–1980), the daughter of cantor Ferdinand Falk and Ida Rosenberger. Bjuggren died on 4 April 1968 in Stockholm and was buried at Lidingö Cemetery.

Dates of rank
19?? – Second lieutenant
19?? – Lieutenant
1937 – Captain
1941 – Major
1943 – Lieutenant colonel
1946 – Colonel
1954 – Major general
1964 – Lieutenant general

Awards and decorations

Bjuggren's awards:

Swedish
   Commander Grand Cross of the Order of the Sword (6 June 1964)
   Knight of the Order of the Polar Star
   Knight of the Order of Vasa
   Vasa Medal in gold

Foreign
  Commander of the Order of St. Olav with Star
  Commander of the Order of the Crown of Italy
  Knight First Class of the Order of the White Rose of Finland
  Knight of the Order of the German Eagle
  Officer of the Legion of Honour
  Fourth Class of the Order of the Cross of Liberty with Swords
  Finnish War Memorial Medal (Finsk krigsminnesmedalj)
  Finnish Air Force's aviation badge (Finska luftstridskrafternas flygmärke)
  French Air Force's aviation badge (Franska luftstridskrafternas flygmärke)
  Polish Air Force's aviation badge (Polska luftstridskrafternas flygmärke)
  Italian Air Force's aviation badge (Italienska luftstridskrafternas flygmärke)

Bibliography

References

1904 births
1968 deaths
Swedish Air Force lieutenant generals
People from Karlsborg Municipality
Members of the Royal Swedish Academy of War Sciences
Commanders Grand Cross of the Order of the Sword
Knights of the Order of the Polar Star
Knights of the Order of Vasa